Męcina  is a village in the administrative district in the Malopolska province of Gmina Limanowa, within Limanowa County, Lesser Poland Voivodeship, in southern Poland. In the years 1975-1998 the town administratively belonged to the province of Nowy Sacz. The village has a population of 3,248 as of 2013.

Location 
Męcina rests at the edge of the mountain called Łososińskiego. In the middle of Męcina there is a stream called Smolnik. It is a tributary of a well known river called Dunajec, at the district road Limanowa-Chełmiec.The yellow trail leads to the mountain ridge of Łososińskiego.

History 
The oldest traces of human activity in this area are documented between Męcina and writers . Archaeological excavations have revealed here urnowe burial from the times of the Lusatian culture, which lands Polish lasted in the period 1300-400 BC [2] .

The first mention of the village comes from a knight Męcina pence from 1326 and relate to the local parish [3] .

At the end of the sixteenth century. Męcina divided into Niżna and religion, noble families ruled here Krzeszów and Marcinkowskich. In the mid-sixteenth century. Męciny heir Sebastian Krzesz fell into a dispute with the local parish priest, who soon turned into open conflict [4] . Victorious from this battle came Krzesz, who eventually exiled priest, seized his property, poniszczył parish registers, and the place had brought two preachers Arian . In the temple instead of altars set plain wooden cross [2] . During the Reformation the church served the local congregation ariańskiemu ( brothers Polish ).

It was only in 1605. Arrived at the place of a new Catholic priest that his ministry had to start from the renovation of the church, in which he helped finance the next heir of the House of Krzeszów - Stanislaw, who converted to Catholicism [2] .

In the nineteenth century. Męcinie pastor was Father Vincent Wąsikiewicz, researcher of folk culture, the author of books and ethnographic studies. During this period Męcinie were several noble mansions and manors. In Męcinie Lower the court called "White" (today the area opposite the school) in the nineteenth century. Gostkowskich family farmed, while close Kłodnego was a mansion called "Bobrówka" (today, leaving behind 2 small spichlerzyki). In the Upper Męcinie was in the nineteenth century. Mansion called "oak" (approx. 1 km from the church, at the top of the village, on the right side of the road to the writers), which also gospodarzyła another branch of the family Gostkowskich.

After the war Męcina became famous throughout the country and beyond its borders thanks to the label hockey sticks Bronislaw Smolen .Bronislaw Smoleń initiated the construction of a school in Męcinie and many other social actions. On the wall of the school is a plaque dedicated to his person, unveiled on 1 September 1997 [5] .

Interesting and historic buildings in the village 
In the center of the village on the road to Nowy Sacz is a church. St. Abate from the end of the seventeenth century, wooden, built on the framework of a tower pole construction. Inside preserved rainbow beam with a Baroque crucifix, the choir edging profiles and Baroque. At the altar, there is a stone crypt heirs Męciny and local pastors. The porch hangs a painting of St. John Cantius and St. figure. John of Nepomuk from 1740 [2] [6] .

Built between 1984-2006 a new church brick acting now a parish church.

Chamber memory Zdzislaw Smolen - Inspector District Podhalańsko - Carpathian Rifle Association "Sagittarius", which gathered quite a rich collection of family memorabilia, including photos, a collection orzełków military uniforms soldiers and weapons (including Russian saber, captured in the Battle of Warsaw 1920) [ 2] .

House of creative work and Zygmunt Jolanta Kłosowskich, local painters and sculptors [2] .

The historic chapel from the seventeenth century in the hamlet Miczaki at which celebrated worship Catholics męcińscy at a time when the local church was converted into a church Arian [2] .

Above Miczakami is a large sandstone quarry (recently resumed work).

In the lower part of the village, on the road to Krasne Potocki you can see ruined, two hundred years old mill . Fragments of the old mill wheel [2] .

In the center of the village there is also a group of schools, fire station OSP, a few shops, a railway station.

Born in Męcina 
 Ferdinand Piwowar and Wladyslaw Pociecha , victims of the Katyn massacre [7] .

See also 
 Męcina Mała, 
 Męcina Wielka

References 

 GUS - Local Data Bank ( pol. ) .
 Beskidwyspowy.eu: Męcina ( pol. ) . www.beskidwyspowy.eu
 P. Skoczek, "Parishes ...", p. 139
 A. Matuszczyk, "Beskid ...", p. 166
 A. Matuszczyk, "Beskid ...", p. 167
 P. Skoczek, "Parishes ...", pp. 139–145
 Louis Dudzik. Katyn - symbolic graves in Męcinie . "Furrow Stone", p. 11, No. 74 - April 2009. ISSN 1734-350X .

Bibliography 
 Peter Skoczek: Parishes Earth Limanowa . Proszówki: Provincial Publishing House, 2009, pp. 139–145.  .
 Andrzej Matuszczyk: Beskid Wyspowy . Pruszkow: Brain Training Publishing House, 2008, p. 166-167.  .
 Męcina in the geographical Dictionary of the Polish Kingdom , Volume VI (Malczyce - Netreba) of 1885.

Villages in Limanowa County